The 1996 Penn Quakers football team was an American football team that represented the University of Pennsylvania in the Ivy League during the 1996 NCAA Division I-AA football season. In its fifth season under head coach Al Bagnoli, the team compiled a 5–5 record (3–4 against Ivy League opponents).

Tim Gage and Matt Julien were the team captains. Defensive tackle Mitch Marrow led the team on defense; at the end of the season, he was selected as a first-team All-American. Jasen Scott was selected as the team's most valuable player. Barrow and Scott both received first-team honors on the 1997 All-Ivy League team.

The team's statistical leaders included Tom MacLeod with 720 passing yards, Mark Fabish with 302 receiving yards, and Jasen Scott with 1,193 rushing yards and 68 points scored.

Schedule

Roster

References

Penn
Penn Quakers football seasons
Penn Quakers football